Oren Etzioni (born 1964) is an American entrepreneur, Professor Emeritus of computer science, and founding CEO of the Allen Institute for Artificial Intelligence (AI2). On June 15, 2022, he announced that he will step down as CEO of AI2 effective September 30, 2022. After that time, he will continue as a board member and advisor. Etzioni will also take the position of Technical Director of the AI2 Incubator.

Early life and education
Etzioni is the son of Israeli-American intellectual Amitai Etzioni. He was the first student to major in computer science at Harvard University, where he earned a bachelor's degree in 1986. He earned a PhD from Carnegie Mellon University in January, 1991, supervised by Tom M. Mitchell.

University of Washington career
Etzioni joined the University of Washington faculty in 1991, immediately after receiving his PhD.
He rose through the ranks to become the Washington Research Foundation Entrepreneurship Professor in Computer Science & Engineering.

Etzioni's research has been focused on basic problems in the study of intelligence, machine reading, machine learning and web search. Past projects include Internet Softbots—the study of intelligent agents in the context of real-world software testbeds. In 2003, he started the KnowItAll project for acquiring massive amounts of information from the web. In 2005, he founded and became the director of the university's Turing Center. The center investigated problems in data mining, natural language processing, the Semantic Web and other web search topics. Etzioni coined the term machine reading and helped to create the first commercial comparison shopping agent. He has published over 200 technical papers

Entrepreneurship
As a faculty member Etzioni was also an active entrepreneur, founding multiple companies and pioneering multiple technologies including MetaCrawler (bought by Infospace), Netbot (bought by Excite in 1997 for $35 million), and ClearForest (bought by Reuters). He founded Farecast, a travel metasearch and price prediction site, which was acquired by Microsoft in 2008 for $115 million. He also co-founded Decide.com, a website to help consumers make buying decisions using previous price history and recommendations from other users. Decide.com was bought by eBay in September, 2013. Etzioni is also a venture partner at the Madrona Venture Group.

AI2's Founding CEO
In September 2013 Etzioni was selected as the Founding CEO of the Allen Institute for Artificial Intelligence,
and in January 2014 he took a leave of absence from the University of Washington to serve
in that role.

From inception, Etzioni partnered with late philanthropist Paul G. Allen to create one of the most highly respected AI research institutes in the world. Building on years of research, education, and startup experience, Etzioni developed an organizational culture that brought dedicated researchers from around the world together to conquer grand AI challenges followed by sharing products and resources openly with the world.

Under Etzioni’s leadership, AI2 grew from zero to over two hundred team members including world-class researchers and engineers across several domains of AI. Over the last eight years, AI2 researchers have published close to 700 papers in premier venues including AAAI, ACL, CVPR, NeurIPS, ICLR, and more.   Twenty-four of these papers have garnered special-recognition awards. AI2 offers several key resources and tools to the AI community including the AllenNLP library, Semantic Scholar, and the impactful conservation platforms EarthRanger and Skylight.

Ed Lazowska, AI2 Board Member and Professor/Bill & Melinda Gates Chair Emeritus at the University of Washington’s Paul G. Allen School of Computer Science & Engineering, shared that  “Oren took the collegial, collaborative culture that he absorbed in his 20+ years as a professor in UW's Allen School and mixed it with the singular focus that drives startups to create an elixir that AI2 folks have been drinking over the last eight years. The result is an exceptional organization of scientists, engineers, and entrepreneurs that's pursuing Paul Allen’s vision of ‘AI for the Common Good’ with extraordinary success.”

AI2 Board Member and Corporate Vice President at Microsoft, Peter Lee, said this: “AI2 is a place for visionary research in artificial intelligence, with a special focus on common sense reasoning and an understanding of AI integrating with people in the real world. In that sense, AI2 is a perfect reflection of Oren Etzioni, its leader all these years – a visionary researcher who leads with common sense and tremendous empathy for the role that technology can play in helping people around the world.”

Etzioni's technical contributions continued at AI2; for example, in 2015, he helped to create the Semantic Scholar search engine.

Popular press

In addition to his scientific publications, Etzioni has written commentary on AI for The New York Times, Wired, Nature, and other publications. 
After reading the idea in a book about AI by Brad Smith and Harry Shum, Etzioni has attempted to create an oath for AI practitioners.

Awards and recognition
In 1993, Etzioni received a National Young Investigator Award.
In 2003, Etzioni was elected as AAAI Fellow.
In 2005, Etzioni received an IJCAI Distinguished Paper Award for "A Probabilistic Model of Redundancy in Information Extraction".
In 2007, he received the Robert S. Engelmore Memorial Award.
In 2012 Etzioni was featured as GeekWire's "Geek of the Week".
In 2013 Etzioni was voted "Geek of the Year" through GeekWire.

Selected publications

Scholarly publications

Popular articles

References

Further reading

External links
Allen Institute for Artificial Intelligence Page
University of Washington faculty profile
Oren Etzioni - The Mathematics Genealogy Project
 , Microsoft Research
Profile at Allen Institute for AI

1964 births
Living people
American chief executives
American computer businesspeople
American computer scientists
Artificial intelligence researchers
Businesspeople from Seattle
Carnegie Mellon University alumni
Data miners
Harvard University alumni
Machine learning researchers
Natural language processing researchers
Scientists from Seattle
University of Washington faculty
21st-century American scientists
21st-century American businesspeople
American people of Israeli descent
American people of German-Jewish descent